Laishram Nandakumar Singh was a veteran politician from Manipur, India. In 2002 to 2017  he was elected to the Legislative Assembly of Manipur, as the Indian National Congress candidate in the constituency Uripok. In the 1995 and 2000 elections he contested the same seat, as a member of Federal Party of Manipur. He finished second both times.

In 2002 he was appointed Minister of Urban Development, law and legislative, education, health, labour, in the Manipur state government.
 Prior to entering politics, he was the Vice Charmain of the All India Bar Council and Senior Advocate of the Guwahati High Court.

References

Indian National Congress politicians
Living people
Manipur politicians
Year of birth missing (living people)
Manipur MLAs 2002–2007
Manipur MLAs 2007–2012
Manipur MLAs 2012–2017